USS Ohio (SSBN-726/SSGN-726), the lead boat of her class of nuclear-powered fleet ballistic missile submarines (SSBN), is the fourth vessel of the United States Navy to be named for the U.S. state of Ohio. She was commissioned with the hull designation of SSBN-726, and with her conversion to a guided missile submarine she was re-designated SSGN-726.

Conversion to SSGN 

Original plans called for Ohio to be retired in 2002. Instead, Ohio and three sister boats were modified and remain in service as cruise missile submarines (SSGNs). In November 2003 Ohio entered drydock, beginning a 36-month refueling and conversion overhaul.  Electric Boat announced on 9 January 2006 that the conversion had been completed.

Service history

As SSBN
The contract to build her was awarded to the Electric Boat Division of General Dynamics Corporation in Groton, Connecticut on 1 July 1974 and her keel was laid down on 10 April 1976 by Mrs. Robert A. Taft, JR., wife of Senator Robert Taft Jr. On 2 February 1978, the Precommissioning Unit was formed with Commander A. K. Thompson as its commanding officer.  Ohio was launched on 7 April 1979 sponsored by Mrs. Annie Glenn, wife of Senator John H. Glenn.

In the summer of 1981, sea trials were held to test the equipment and systems, and the submarine was delivered to the U.S. Navy on 28 October 1981.  On 11 November 1981, Ohio was commissioned. The principal speaker, Vice President George H. W. Bush, remarked to the 8000 assembled guests that the boat introduced a "new dimension in our nation's strategic deterrence," and Admiral Hyman G. Rickover noted that Ohio should "strike fear in the hearts of our enemies." On that day, command of the two crews (designated Blue and Gold) of Ohio was assumed by Captain A. K. Thompson (Blue) and Captain A. F. Campbell (Gold).

Following Post Shakedown Availability at Electric Boat Division, Ohio left the Atlantic and transited to her new home port, Bangor, Washington, by way of Cape Canaveral – where she tested her missile launch systems – and the Panama Canal, arriving on 12 August 1982.  During August and September 1982, the first loadout of Trident C-4 missiles and a predeployment refit were conducted. Ohio and her Blue Crew departed on the first Trident Submarine Strategic Deterrent Patrol in October 1982.

From June 1993 to June 1994 Ohio underwent overhaul at Puget Sound Naval Shipyard, Bremerton, Washington, receiving extensive upgrades to sonar, fire control, and navigation systems. Ohio resumed strategic deterrent patrols in January 1995 as part of Submarine Squadron Seventeen, Submarine Group Nine, Pacific Submarine Force.

As SSGN
Following her conversion to a SSGN, Ohio rejoined the fleet on 7 February 2006. On 21 January 2007, the Gold Crew departed Naval Base Kitsap for Hawaii to conduct a forward-deployed crew exchange, the first such forward-deployed swap in approximately 20 years. Ballistic submarines of Ohios class employ two crews, Blue and Gold, in order to facilitate continuous operation at sea, called "forward-presence" in USN parlance. Ohio left for her first mission as an SSGN on 15 October 2007. The Blue crew underwent several tests and inspections before completing a mission some time in December. Ohio was also the first one of the class to complete a mission.

On 28 June 2010, Ohio was one of three Ohio-class submarines involved in a US response to Chinese missile testing in the contested East China Sea. Ohio, and  all surfaced simultaneously in the waters of the Philippines, South Korea, and the British Indian Ocean Territory respectively. In November 2011, Lt. Britta Christianson became the first female officer, and first female overall, to qualify for service on a US Navy submarine, being assigned to Ohios Gold Crew. The first female enlisted sailor qualified in August 2016, assigned to sister boat, Michigan.

In December 2020, it was announced that Ohio would be decommissioned and enter the Ship-Submarine Recycling Program by 2026.

Awards
 Acting Navy Secretary Robert B. Pirie, Jr. announced the 2001 winners of the Navy Captain Edward F. Ney Memorial Awards and the Marine Corps Major General W. P. T. Hill Memorial Awards for outstanding food service in the Navy and Marine Corps. The formal presentation of the awards was made during the International Food Service Executives Association (IFSEA) conference on Saturday, 3 March 2001, in Anaheim, California. The afloat galley first-place winner in the Pacific fleet was Ohio (Blue). This award was before her conversion from SSBN to SSGN.

References

External links 
 Keel Laying – Commissioning
 Life as a SSBN / 1982–2002
 Conversion to SSGN

Ships built in Groton, Connecticut
Ohio-class submarines
Nuclear submarines of the United States Navy
Symbols of Ohio
1979 ships
Ballistic missile submarines
Cold War submarines of the United States
Submarines of the United States